Hsinchu Baseball Stadium is a  baseball stadium in North District, Hsinchu City, Taiwan. It hosted occasional games for Taichung Agan and Taipei Gida in the defunct Taiwan Major League. The stadium is now the ball park for Wei Chuan Dragons of the Chinese Professional Baseball League.

History

Originally it was to be named as the Hsinchu Sadaharu Oh Baseball Stadium; however, during its construction the then President of the Republic of China (Taiwan), Chiang Kai-shek passed away, and the stadium was renamed Hsinchu Chung-Cheng Baseball Stadium in his honor. Reference to Chiang was dropped after the renovation in 2022. Inaugurated on 27 November 1976, the stadium has been in use ever since. The stadium renovation started in 2019, and the construction is estimated to finish by the end of 2021, in time for the 2022 Chinese Professional Baseball League season of the Wei Chuan Dragons.

See also
 List of stadiums in Taiwan
 Sport in Taiwan

References

Sports venues completed in 1976
1976 establishments in Taiwan
Baseball venues in Taiwan
Buildings and structures in Hsinchu